Bubble Yum is a brand of bubble gum marketed by The Hershey Company. Introduced in 1975 by Life Savers, the bubble gum was the first soft bubble gum created. It was created by a homemaker in Fisk, Missouri, who named it "rubber bubblegum". She gave some to her son to pass out at school. She soon sold the recipe to the Life Savers candy division in St. Louis.

History 
In 1977, rumors began to spread that the gum's soft, chewable secret was the addition of spider eggs. The Life Savers Company addressed the issue with an official full-page rebuttal printed in prominent U.S. newspapers (including The New York Times), to dispel the rumor and restore public confidence.  Sales of the gum soon surpassed sales of Life Savers candy, and it became the most popular bubble gum brand.  Nabisco bought Life Savers in 1981, and The Hershey Company acquired the Bubble Yum brand in 2000.

Mascot 
Bubble Yum's official mascot is Floyd D. Duck, an anthropomorphic punk-style duck character.

References

External links
 

The Hershey Company brands
Brand name confectionery
Chewing gum
Products introduced in 1975
Urban legends